Brightest Star (also titled Light Years) is a 2013 American independent romantic comedy film directed by Maggie Kiley and starring Chris Lowell and Rose McIver. The film, which also marks Kiley's directorial debut, is based on her 2009 short film Some Boys Don't Leave.

Plot
After his girlfriend dumps him, a young man (Chris Lowell) tries to become the kind of person she desires, but his growing love for a singer (Jessica Szohr) and some advice from an astronomer (Allison Janney) help him remain true to himself.

Cast
Chris Lowell as The Boy
Rose McIver as Charlotte Cates
Jessica Szohr as Lita Markovic
Alex Kaluzhsky as Ray
Clark Gregg as Mr. Markovic
Allison Janney as The Astronomer
Elvy Yost as Jodi
Peter Jacobson as Dr. Lambert

Reception
On review aggregator Rotten Tomatoes, the film holds an approval rating of 13% based on 15 reviews, with an average rating of 4.17/10. On Metacritic, the film has a weighted average score of 32 out of 100, based on nine critics, indicating "generally unfavorable reviews".

Glenn Kenny of RogerEbert.com gave it one and a half stars.

References

External links
 
 

2013 directorial debut films
2013 films
Features based on short films
American independent films
American romantic comedy films
2010s English-language films
2010s American films
2013 romantic comedy films
2013 independent films